"The Whummil Bore" is Child ballad 27. A whummil is a tool for drilling holes.

Synopsis
The narrator served the king seven years and "saw his daughter only once"—meaning saw her naked, through a whummil bore.  She was being dressed by her maids.

Commentary
Only one variant of this ballad exists.  "Hind Horn" appears to contain a stanza from it.

Recording
This is recorded on the Steeleye Span 2006 album Bloody Men.

See also
 List of the Child Ballads

References

Child Ballads
Year of song unknown
Songwriter unknown